For the Love of a Girl is a 1916 American silent film featuring Harry Carey.

Cast
 Harry Carey
 Bessie Arnold
 Joe Rickson
 Olive Carey (as Olive Fuller Golden)
 Neal Hart

See also
 List of American films of 1916
 Harry Carey filmography

External links
 

1916 films
1916 short films
American silent short films
American black-and-white films
1916 Western (genre) films
Films directed by Harry Carey
Silent American Western (genre) films
1910s American films
1910s English-language films